Leptodactylus marambaiae is a species of frog in the family Leptodactylidae.
It is endemic to Brazil.
Its natural habitats are subtropical or tropical moist shrubland, freshwater marshes, intermittent freshwater marshes, and sandy shores.
It is threatened by habitat loss.

References

marambaiae
Endemic fauna of Brazil
Amphibians described in 1976
Taxonomy articles created by Polbot